Duncan Springs (formerly, Duncan Mineral Springs) is a set of springs and the site of a resort from the 1880s in Mendocino County, California.

Duncan Springs was a resort by the 1880s.

References

Reference bibliography 

Unincorporated communities in California
Unincorporated communities in Mendocino County, California